The Newton Lower Falls Branch was a branch of the Boston and Albany Railroad, running  from Newton to Lower Falls in Wellesley. It opened in 1847, and passenger service ended in 1957. The line branched off at Riverside station (not the present Green Line station but a mainline rail station) and ran for a distance of approximately one mile to Lower Falls. The line originally served the mill area at Newton Lower Falls and later the Grossman's Lumber Yard. The last freight train served the line in 1972 and the rails were removed in 1976, but it was never formally abandoned.


Route
The line originally branched off from the Boston and Albany main line on the Weston side of the Charles, and then crossed back over the Charles before continuing on its current course. When the Highland branch was built in 1886, it made more sense to connect to that line. The right-of-way in modern form branches off from the Riverside Yard, which serves the Highland branch (which since 1959 has been the Green Line D branch). It crosses highway ramps and Route 128 before running parallel to the Leo J Martin golf course. It transects a residential area before crossing Concord Street and the Charles in to Wellesley. The tracks extended across Route 16 after crossing the Charles River a few hundred yards before ending. 

Most of the rail grade in Newton is intact, while in Wellesley it has mostly been built over. The tracks have been removed, although three bridges are still extant: a pair over Route 128 and the off-ramp from exit 23, and one over the Charles River that still carries a single track.

Service
One of the more interesting aspects of this short branch line was the use of an interurban-style electric car #01 (nicknamed the "Ping Pong"), which would provide shuttle service between the Riverside Station on the Boston and Albany main line and a single station at Lower Falls. 
Early in the 20th century, to eliminate the cost and inconvenience of running a steam-powered train, the Boston and Albany Railroad hung trolley wire over the track. For a brief period before passenger service ended, a single coach was pulled or pushed by an RS-1 locomotive.

References

External links
Image of the former crossing at Concord Street
Bridges over Route 128 and off-ramp on Bing Maps
 
Boston and Albany Railroad lines
Rail infrastructure in Massachusetts
Closed railway lines in the United States